The 2014 United States Senate election in Colorado was held on November 4, 2014 to elect a member of the United States Senate to represent the State of Colorado, concurrently with the election of the Governor of Colorado, other elections to the United States Senate, elections to the United States House of Representatives, and various state and local elections. Incumbent Democratic Senator Mark Udall ran for re-election to a second term, but lost to Republican U.S. Representative Cory Gardner by a margin of 1.9 percent.

This is also the last time the Republican candidate won Larimer County.

Democratic primary 
Mark Udall was the only Democrat to file to run, and thus at the Democratic state assembly on April 12, 2014, he was renominated unopposed.

Candidates

Nominated 
 Mark Udall, incumbent U.S. Senator

Results

Republican primary 
At the Republican state assembly on April 12, 2014, Cory Gardner received 73% of the votes of over 3,900 delegates. Neither Randy Baumgardner nor Tom Janich received the required 30% make the ballot and thus Gardner received the party's nomination.

Candidates

Nominated 
 Cory Gardner, U.S. Representative

Rejected 
 Randy Baumgardner, state senator
 Tom Janich, perennial candidate

Withdrew 
 Mark Aspiri, businessman
 Ken Buck, Weld County District Attorney and nominee for the U.S. Senate in 2010 (running for CO-04)
 Owen Hill, state senator
 Jaime McMillan, businessman
 Amy Stephens, state representative
 Floyd Trujillo, businessman

Declined 
 Bob Beauprez, former U.S. Representative and nominee for Governor in 2006 (running for Governor)
 Mike Coffman, U.S. Representative
 Dan Domenico, Solicitor General of Colorado
 Doug Lamborn, U.S. Representative
 Jane E. Norton, former lieutenant governor of Colorado and candidate for the U.S. Senate in 2010
 Scott Renfroe, state senator
 Victor E. Renuart, Jr., former commander of United States Northern Command and the North American Aerospace Defense Command
 Ellen Roberts, state senator
 John Suthers, Attorney General of Colorado
 Scott Tipton, U.S. Representative

Endorsements

Polling

Results

Libertarian Party

Candidates

Nominated 
 Gaylon Kent, candidate for Colorado's 3rd congressional district in 2012

Unity Party of America

Candidates

Nominated 
 Bill Hammons, founder and National Chairman of the Unity Party of America

Independents

Candidates

Declared 
 Raúl Acosta, IT professional
 Steve Shogan, neurosurgeon

General election

Fundraising

Debates 
 Complete video of debate, October 6, 2014
 Complete video of debate, October 15, 2014

Predictions

Polling

Results

By county

Counties that flipped from Democratic to Republican 
Chaffee (largest municipality: Salida)
Conejos (largest municipality: Manassa)
Garfield (largest municipality: Rifle)
Grand (largest municipality: Granby)
Larimer (largest municipality: Fort Collins)
Las Animas (largest municipality: Trinidad)
Mineral (largest municipality: Creede)

See also 
 2014 United States Senate elections
 2014 United States elections
 2014 United States House of Representatives elections in Colorado
 2014 Colorado gubernatorial election

References

External links 
 U.S. Senate elections in Colorado, 2014 at Ballotpedia
 Campaign contributions at OpenSecrets
 Colorado Senate debate excerpts, OnTheIssues.org
 Blog regarding immigration as an issue in this election in the Washington Post

Colorado
2014
United States Senate